

Pre-season and friendlies

Competitions

Primeira Liga

League table

Results summary

Results by round

Matches

Taça de Portugal

Third round

Fourth round

Fifth round

Quarter-finals

Taça da Liga

Second round

Overall record

Player statistics

|-
! colspan="12" style="background:#dcdcdc; text-align:center;"| Goalkeepers

|-
! colspan="12" style="background:#dcdcdc; text-align:center;"| Defenders

|-
! colspan="12" style="background:#dcdcdc; text-align:center;"| Midfielders

|-
! colspan="12" style="background:#dcdcdc; text-align:center;"| Strikers

|-

Technical staff

References

Associação Académica de Coimbra – O.A.F. seasons
Académica